
The Billerica Public Library is a public library in Billerica, Massachusetts. Since 2000 it has been located on Concord Road.

History

In the late 19th century, "Billerica's free library, known as the Bennett Public Library, was founded by Mrs. Joshua Bennett, who erected, at a cost of $9,000, a suitable building for the purpose, and deeded it to the Bennett Library Association in 1880. ... The town contributes nothing for the support of the library."  The architects of the Bennett building were Boston architects Rotch & Tilden.

Initially, subscribers were charged an annual fee for use of the library. By 1899, "the membership fee to the associates, to whom a few special privileges are allowed, is one dollar, but all citizens are given the free use of the library."

In fiscal year 2008, the town of Billerica spent 1.09% of its budget on the library—some $29 per person. The library's total budget was $1,209,203.

References

Further reading
 Catalogue, constitution, rules and regulations of the Bennett Public Library Association of Billerica. C. F. Jones & Co. Printers, 1882. Google books
 Paula D. Watson. Carnegie Ladies, Lady Carnegies: Women and the Building of Libraries. Libraries & Culture, Vol. 31, No. 1, Reading & Libraries (Winter, 1996)

External links
 http://www.billericalibrary.org/
 https://www.flickr.com/photos/pkeleher/1579977566/
 Flickr. Photo of Stephen King at the library, 1983
 Flickr. Photo of library building, 1979-2000
 Flickr. Billerica Public Library's photostream

Image gallery

Public libraries in Massachusetts
1880 establishments in Massachusetts
Libraries in Middlesex County, Massachusetts
Libraries established in 1880